The Hochfernerspitze is a mountain in the Zillertal Alps in South Tyrol, Italy.

References 
 Heinrich und Walter Klier: Alpenvereinsführer Zillertaler Alpen, Rother Verlag München (1996), 
 Alpine Club Map 1:25.000, Sheet 35/1
 Tabacco-Verlag, Udine, carta topografica 1:25.000, Sheet 037, Hochfeiler-Pfunderer Berge

External links 

Mountains of the Alps
Mountains of South Tyrol
Alpine three-thousanders
Zillertal Alps